The Berna L275/10 is a truck model manufactured by the Swiss company Berna from 1937 onwards. The Berna L275 / 10, military designation "Lastw gl 1.5t 4x2", (Lastw gl = Lastwagen geländegängig = offroad truck) has a total weight of 2200 kg, a structure with cabin and bridge as well as an on-board voltage of 6 V. The 6-cylinder petrol engine with 3600 cm³ produces a power of 66 kW (90 hp).

The Berna L275 / 10 were used until 1966 in the service of the Swiss Armed Forces. A Berna L275 / 10 truck is now in the :de:Zuger Depot Technikgeschichte. Exactly this Berna L275/10 took part in the movie The Boat Is Full.

References

Zuger Depot Technikgeschichte

Military trucks of Switzerland
Off-road vehicles